Darío Fernando Husaín (born 2 May 1976 in Haedo, Buenos Aires Province) is an Argentine former footballer who played as a forward. His brother Claudio Husaín is also a former professional football player.

Titles
 Vélez Sarsfield 1996 (Torneo Clausura), 1998 (Torneo Clausura)
 River Plate 2003 (Torneo Clausura)
 Universidad Católica 2004 (Torneo Amistoso)

External links

1976 births
Living people
Sportspeople from Buenos Aires Province
Argentine people of Lebanese descent
Argentine people of Syrian descent
Sportspeople of Lebanese descent
Association football forwards
Argentine footballers
Argentine expatriate footballers
Argentina international footballers
Club Atlético River Plate footballers
Racing Club de Avellaneda footballers
Club Atlético Vélez Sarsfield footballers
San Martín de San Juan footballers
Club Deportivo Universidad Católica footballers
Deportivo Pereira footballers
Puerto Rico Islanders players
Argentine Primera División players
Categoría Primera A players
Expatriate footballers in Chile
Expatriate footballers in Colombia
Expatriate footballers in Puerto Rico
Expatriate footballers in the Maldives